Pseudoaclisina is a genus of sea snails, marine gastropod mollusks in the subfamily Murchisonellinae of the family Murchisonellidae, the pyrams and their allies.

Species
 Pseudoaclisina conica Peñas & Rolán, 2013
 Pseudoaclisina indivisa Peñas & Rolán, 2013
 Pseudoaclisina linealis Peñas & Rolán, 2013
 Pseudoaclisina micrometrica Peñas & Rolán, 2013
 Pseudoaclisina multistriata Peñas & Rolán, 2013
 Pseudoaclisina planicula Peñas & Rolán, 2013
 Pseudoaclisina rarisulcata Peñas & Rolán, 2013
 † Pseudoaclisina turgida (Yoo, 1988)

References

 Peñas, A.; Rolán, E. (2013). Revision of the genera Murchisonella and Pseudoaclisina (Gastropoda, Heterobranchia, Murchisonellidae). Vita Malacologica. 11: 15-64

External links
 

Murchisonellidae